Quax in Africa is a German comedy adventure film produced from 1943–1944 and released in 1947, directed by Helmut Weiss and starring Heinz Rühmann, Hertha Feiler, and Lothar Firmans. It is a sequel to the 1941 film Quax the Crash Pilot.

Plot
The year is circa 1932, and the initial setting is Bavaria, Germany. The novice aviator Otto Groschenbügel, nicknamed Quax (see the previous film Quax the Crash Pilot), has advanced to become a professional flying instructor at the Flying School of Bergried. Although by nature a congenial fellow, he decides to adopt an authoritarian manner when learning of his pupils' unruly womanising. However his stern lectures that women have no place on an aerodrome are undermined when his friend Marianne unexpectedly visits him, and even more so when two female trainee pilots are assigned to him. Soon, the flying school's chief instructor announces that the Europaflug contest (an air rallye from Germany via Spain to Africa and back) is scheduled to start from Bergried, and Quax together with one male and the two female trainee pilots take part, by which time Quax is finally persuaded of the women's flying abilities. En route in Spain they indulge in local dances and merriment and Quax casts off his disciplinarian persona. In Africa, the team crash their two planes and are discovered by natives. Quax is obliged to marry the tribal chief's daughter Banani, and they take part in an African ritual dance. Finally a rescue plane arrives and returns the aviators to their home country.

Production
Both the precursor film Quax the Crash Pilot and the sequel Quax in Africa are based on books written by Dr. Herrmann Grote (1904–1980). The first book carried the same title Quax der Bruchpilot as the first film and was published in 1936, while the second book was originally published under the title Quax auf Abwegen [Quax off track] before being republished as Quax in Afrika.

The film was shot from July 1943 to January 1944, but was not released during the war. In 1945 it was banned by the Allied occupation authorities and, although it was distributed in Sweden in 1947, did not get a full West German release until 1953.

It was made at the Babelsberg Studios in Potsdam. Some scenes were shot at an airfield near the Bavarian town of Kempten while parts of Brandenburg doubled for the African scenes. The film's sets were designed by Willi Herrmann.

Although the female lead from the previous film Karin Himboldt appears again, the principal romantic interest is now played by Rühmann's real-life wife Hertha Feiler.

Cast

See also
 Überläufer

References

Bibliography

External links 
 

1947 films
1947 comedy films
German comedy films
Films of Nazi Germany
West German films
1940s German-language films
Films directed by Helmut Weiss
German sequel films
German aviation films
Films set in Africa
Films about race and ethnicity
Terra Film films
Films set in the 1930s
German black-and-white films
1940s German films
Films shot at Babelsberg Studios